Rhodoplanes elegans is a phototrophic purple nonsulfur bacteria with rod-shaped cells.

References

Further reading
Brenner, Don J., et al. "Bergey's manual of systematic bacteriology, vol. 2."The Proteobacteria. East Lansing, USA 183 (2005).
Blankenship, Robert E., Michael T. Madigan, and Carl E. Bauer, eds. Anoxygenic photosynthetic bacteria. Vol. 2. Springer, 1995.

External links

LPSN
Type strain of Rhodoplanes elegans at BacDive -  the Bacterial Diversity Metadatabase

Nitrobacteraceae